Stanisław Stec (pronounced ; born 22 March 1941 in Jazowsko) is a Polish politician. He was elected to Sejm on 25 September 2005, getting 9944 votes in 38 Piła district as a candidate from Democratic Left Alliance list.

He was also a member of Sejm 1993-1997, Sejm 1997-2001, and Sejm 2001-2005.

See also
Members of Polish Sejm 2005-2007

External links
Stanisław Stec - parliamentary page - includes declarations of interest, voting record, and transcripts of speeches.

1941 births
Living people
People from Nowy Sącz County
Polish United Workers' Party members
Social Democracy of the Republic of Poland politicians
Democratic Left Alliance politicians
Members of the Polish Sejm 2005–2007
Members of the Polish Sejm 1993–1997
Members of the Polish Sejm 1997–2001
Members of the Polish Sejm 2001–2005
Members of the Polish Sejm 2007–2011